Lespedeza hirta, the hairy lespedeza or hairy bush clover, is a perennial forb native to Ontario and the eastern United States. It grows at most three feet high. It has inconspicuous small white blooms in the summer and prefers average to dry soil. It is noteworthy for the number of Lepidoptera species it supports. It is a larval host to the bella moth, black-spotted prominent moth, cloudless sulpher, confused cloudy-wing, eastern tailed blue, gray hairstreak, southern cloudywing, and zarucco duskywing.

References

hirta